Pedro Juan Vázquez Bragan (born August 5, 1989), known professionally as PJ Sin Suela, is a Puerto Rican rapper and doctor. Born in The Bronx, New York City and raised in Ponce, Puerto Rico, he graduated from medical school in 2015 before pursuing a musical career. He is known for his socially-conscious lyrics and his collaboration with Bad Bunny and Ñejo on the single "Cual Es Tu Plan?" reached number 13 on the Billboard Hot Latin Songs chart in August 2018. The song also reached number 17 on the Billboard Latin Digital Song Sales chart.

Life and career
PJ Sin Suela was born in The Bronx borough of New York City on August 5, 1989, and raised in Ponce, Puerto Rico. He developed an interest in music from his mother, who played the guitar. He gained a reputation in high school for rapping for his classmates at lunch but viewed a music career as a "silly dream". He graduated with an MD degree from medical school at Universidad Central del Caribe in 2015, after which he decided to pursue music as a career. The rapper has stated that he was unusual in the hip-hop scene because, "I'm white, I have an afro, I don't have tattoos, I studied medicine, and I didn't come from the street". He initially began performing with the plan of only doing so for a year, but noticed that the money he generated from his performances allowed him to pay his rent. He has since stated that after the success of his career, he "doesn't see himself in a hospital" but plans to give educational classes and lectures about medicine. However, he has since returned to the medical field due to the COVID-19 pandemic, working in the Hospital San Cristóbal in Ponce. 

As his career was gaining traction, PJ Sin Suela took note of the crisis in his home country and provided medical assistance to Puerto Ricans after Hurricane Maria in 2017. In August 2018, his collaboration with Bad Bunny and Ñejo on the single "Cual Es Tu Plan?" reached number 13 on the Billboard Hot Latin Songs chart and number 17 on the Billboard Latin Digital Song Sales chart. In September 2018, he served as the opening act for Puerto Rican rapper Residente. That same month, he featured along with many other Puerto Rican artists on Lin-Manuel Miranda's song "A Forgotten Spot". Billboard named him as one of "10 Latin Artists to Watch in 2019". In July 2019, he participated in protests in Puerto Rico demanding the resignation of governor Ricardo Rosselló. In August 2019, he released the remix of his single "La Pelúa" with Guaynaa, Jon Z and Rafa Pabón. In December 2019, he released the first single from his upcoming album, a collaborative single titled "Por Ti" with Beto Montenegro, the lead singer of the Venezuelan band Rawayana. In March 2020, he collaborated with Uruguayan musician Jorge Drexler on the song "Loco Loquito".

Artistry
PJ Sin Suela cites Vico C, OutKast, Joaquín Sabina, Blink-182, Calle 13, and Eminem as influences. His music often discusses social and political themes, and one of his goals as an artist is to "make a positive social change in the world". His song "Mueve la Chola" denounces violence and was inspired by the rapper's experience of helping a shooting victim into an ambulance. The song's accompanying music video features 60 women lip syncing the lyrics to the song.

Discography
Letra Pa' tu Coco (2015)
De Vuelta a Casa (2021)
 Chinchorreo Vol.1 (2023)

References

1989 births
Living people
Latin music songwriters
Urbano musicians
Puerto Rican hip hop musicians
Puerto Rican rappers
Puerto Rican reggaeton musicians
Spanish-language singers